Ɗuwai (Dó:aí) is an Afro-Asiatic language spoken in Jigawa and Kano States, Nigeria.

Writing System

Notes

External links 
Duwai language resources from UCLA
Duwai language dictionary
OLAC resources in and about the Duwai language

West Chadic languages
Languages of Nigeria